The London Museums of Health & Medicine is a group that brings together some of the activities of several museums in London, England, related to health and medicine. The group was founded in 1991. 

The museums and medical organisations are:

Alexander Fleming Laboratory Museum
Anaesthesia Heritage Centre
Barts Pathology Museum
Bethlem Museum of the Mind
British Dental Association Museum
British Optical Association Museum (College of Optometrists)
British Red Cross Museum
Chelsea Physic Garden 
Florence Nightingale Museum
Foundling Museum
Freud Museum
Hunterian Museum
Langdon Down Museum of Learning Disability
Museum of the Order of St John

Old Operating Theatre Museum & Herb Garret
Royal Botanic Gardens, Kew
Royal College of Nursing Library & Heritage Centre
Royal College of Obstetricians and Gynaecologists
Royal College of Physicians
Royal London Hospital Museum
Royal Pharmaceutical Society Museum
Royal Society of Medicine
Science Museum
St Bartholomew's Hospital Museum
St George's Museum and Archives

Worshipful Society of Apothecaries

See also
List of museums in London

References

External links
Official website of the group

Organizations established in 1991
1991 establishments in England
Museum associations and consortia
Medical and health organisations based in London
Health in London
 
Wellcome Trust
Lists of museums in the United Kingdom